Frank O'Brien may refer to:
Frank O'Brien (politician), Pennsylvania politician
Frank O'Brien (footballer) (1900–1986), Australian rules footballer
Frank P. O'Brien, mayor of Birmingham, Alabama
Dink O'Brien (Frank Aloysius O'Brien, 1894–1971), baseball player

See also
Francis O'Brien (disambiguation)